Utricularia odontosepala is a small to medium-sized, probably annual, carnivorous plant that belongs to the genus Utricularia. It is native to tropical Africa, where it can be found in the Democratic Republic of the Congo, Malawi, and Zambia. It typically flowers between April and September. It was originally described and published by Otto Stapf in 1912. Peter Taylor later reduced the species to a variety of U. welwitschii in 1964 but then reversed his decision and reestablished Stapf's original treatment of the species.

See also 
 List of Utricularia species

References 

Carnivorous plants of Africa
Flora of Malawi
Flora of the Democratic Republic of the Congo
Flora of Zambia
odontosepala